Haskin is a surname. Notable people with the surname include:

 Byron Haskin (1899–1984), American director
 Dewitt Clinton Haskin (c. 1824 – 1900), American engineer
 Grant Haskin (born 1968), South African politician
 John B. Haskin (1821–1895), American politician
 Joseph A. Haskin (1818–1874), United States Army officer
 Marvin Haskin (1930–2009), American physician and professor
 Scott Haskin (born 1970), American basketball player
 Steve Haskin (born 1947), American journalist and writer
 William L. Haskin (1841–1931), United States Army officer

See also
 Haskins (surname)
 Hoskin, surname